Harry Gosling CH (9 June 1861 – 24 October 1930) was a British Labour Party politician and trade union leader.

Early life
Gosling was born in 1861 at 57 York Street, Lambeth, London, on the southern bank of the River Thames. He was the second son of William Gosling, master lighterman, and his wife Sarah Louisa née Rowe, a schoolteacher. His family were watermen, working on the river for several generations. Following an education at Blackfriars Elementary School, he entered employment as an office boy, aged 13. A year later he reached sufficient age to begin a seven-year apprenticeship to the Watermen's Company, working with his father on the wharves that would later become the site of the County Hall.

Trade unionism
The success of the 1889 London Dock Strike encouraged the river workers to form a union, the Amalgamated Society of Watermen, Lightermen and Bargemen. Gosling was one of its first members, and was appointed general secretary in 1892, aged 32. In 1908 he was appointed as the workers' representative on the newly formed Port of London Authority, and to the Parliamentary Committee of the Trades Union Congress. When the Watermen's Society was merged into the Transport and General Workers' Union in 1922, Gosling became the TGWU's first and only president, holding office until his death.

London County Council
He was also a member of London County Council from 1898 to 1925, representing St George's-in-the-East until 1919 and Kennington thereafter. Initially he was a member of the Progressive Party on the council, forming a left wing group of "Labour Progressives" with John Burns, Ben Cooper and Will Crooks. In 1920 Labour formally became a separate party within the council, and Gosling became the first leader of the Labour group.

During the First World War Gosling was a member of the Port and Transit Executive, the body charged with organising imports and exports by sea. At the end of hostilities he was appointed to the Imperial War Graves Commission.

Parliament
Gosling first stood for election to parliament as a Liberal Party candidate at the December 1910 general election but failed to win a seat at Lambeth North. At the next General Election in 1918 he stood as a Labour Party candidate at Uxbridge but was again defeated. The following General Election in 1922 he was again defeated as a Labour candidate at Kennington. In the following year C. J. Matthew, the sitting Labour MP for Whitechapel and St Georges died, and Gosling held the seat for the party at the ensuing by-election, retaining it until his death. For a short period in 1924 he was Minister of Transport and Paymaster General in the First Labour Government.

For the last six years of his life Gosling was in poor health. In 1927 he wrote a book of reminiscences Up and Down Stream. He was the third person to be appointed to the Order of the Companions of Honour. Harry Gosling died at his home in Twickenham in October 1930, aged 69. His body was laid in state at Transport House, headquarters of the TGWU, before its cremation at Golders Green.

References

External links 
 
 

1861 births
1930 deaths
UK MPs 1923–1924
UK MPs 1924–1929
UK MPs 1929–1931
Labour Party (UK) MPs for English constituencies
British Secretaries of State
United Kingdom Paymasters General
Members of London County Council
Presidents of the Trades Union Congress
General secretaries of British trade unions
Members of the Order of the Companions of Honour
Members of the Executive of the Labour and Socialist International
Progressive Party (London) politicians
Members of the Parliamentary Committee of the Trades Union Congress
Secretaries of State for Transport (UK)
Transport and General Workers' Union-sponsored MPs